A Tribute to Al Hurricane was a tribute concert held for Al Hurricane, on April 21, 2007 at Isleta Casino & Showroom.

Concert
The concert had Al Hurricane and his mother, Bennie Sanchez, sitting on stage in couches. While they were entertained by various performers, from throughout Al Hurricane's career. Several performers, such as Al's brother Tiny Morrie got Al to help perform on "La Puerta Negra" and Darren Cordova performed "Mi Amigo" with Al. There was an award presented to Al Hurricane by KANW. Al even performed several songs at the end of the concert, and thanked the performers and audience.

Setlist

Home releases
This concert was recorded and released in three separate releases, a video DVD and two albums.

A Tribute to Al Hurricane "The Godfather" DVD
A Tribute to Al Hurricane "The Godfather" was the DVD release of the concert in its entirety. It featured slideshows, and announcements explaining the upcoming musicians and their songs of choice.

A Tribute To Al Hurricane Vol. 1

Track listing

A Tribute To Al Hurricane Vol. 2

Track listing

References

Tribute concerts in the United States
Al Hurricane albums
April 2007 events in the United States
New Mexico music albums